Takhvij (also Romanized as Takhvīj and Takhvīch; also known as Takhīrīj and Takhrij) is a village in Miyandasht Rural District, in the Central District of Darmian County, South Khorasan Province, Iran. At the 2006 census, its population was 216, in 50 families.

References 

Populated places in Darmian County